Arulmigu Kapaleeswarar Arts and Science College is a college established in the year 2021, in Kolathur neighbourhood, in Tiruvallur district of the state Tamil Nadu in the peninsular India. This is the first of its kind in Kolathur, as there is no other college. At present, 250 students are studying here.

Location 
Located at an altitude of 34 m above the mean sea level, the geographical coordinates of Arulmigu Kapaleeswarar Arts and Science College are: 13°07'32.1"N, 80°13'12.9"E (i.e. 13.125583°N, 80.220250°E).

Transport

Road transport 
From the Retteri junction, a four-road intersection, that connects Chennai to various districts and states, this college is located just a km away.

Rail transport 
Villivakkam railway station, Perambur railway station, Perambur Carriage Works railway station and Perambur Loco Works railway station are some of the railway stations that are nearer to this college.

Air transport 
Chennai International Airport is located at about 22 km from this college.

Beneficial neighbourhoods 
Kolathur, Chennai, Ponniammanmedu, Lakshmipuram, Vinayagapuram, Madhavaram, Peravallur, Periyar Nagar, Jawahar Nagar, Agaram, Sembium, Thiru. Vi. Ka Nagar and Perambur are some of the neighbourhoods benefited by this college.

Courses offered 
This college offers undergraduate courses as follows:
B.Com., B.B.A., B.C.A., and B.Sc. Computer Science. And on the idea to offer courses on religious subjects, a 6-month certificate course on B. A. Saiva Siddhantham is to be included in this college, said by the Tamil Nadu state minister of Hindu Religious and Charitable Endowments Department, Government of Tamil Nadu.

Facilities 
Principal and administrative room, Professor rooms, Seven class rooms, two computer laboratories, one library and toilet facilities are available in this college. This college is temporarily started at the campus of a private school viz., Everwin Vidhyashram, which is situated on Red Hills road in Kolathur neighbourhood. This will be shifted permanently to the nearby proposed buildings at the campus of 5 acre land belonging to Somanatha Swamy Temple. 9 Assistant Professors, one librarian and one physical education teacher are appointed.

References 

Colleges in Tamil Nadu